The Ishpeming Municipal Building is a public building located at 100 East Division Street in Ishpeming, Michigan. It is also known as Ishpeming City Hall. The building was designated a Michigan State Historic Site in 1980 and listed on the National Register of Historic Places in 1981.

History 
The City Hall in Ishpeming was built during the boom iron-mining years, constructed from 1889 to 1891 using a design by Milwaukee architect Demetrius F. Charlton.  The structure originally housed the jail, a library, and a madhall's office in addition to city government offices.  It is still used by the city of Ishpeming.

Description 
The Ishpeming City Hall is a two-story, rectangular structure built of Portage Entry sandstone and brick on a concrete-and-rubble foundation. The main facade has a rounded entry arch, decorative sandstone sills and lintels above and below the windows, and a decorative beltcourse between the floors. The roof consists of two intersecting gables.  A square tower topped with a pyramidal roof sits at the corner of the structure and a one-story addition housing the jail has a hipped roof.

References

Buildings and structures in Marquette County, Michigan
City and town halls on the National Register of Historic Places in Michigan
Government buildings completed in 1891
Michigan State Historic Sites
National Register of Historic Places in Marquette County, Michigan